Pain management is an aspect of medicine and health care involving relief of pain (pain relief, analgesia, pain control) in various dimensions, from acute and simple to chronic and challenging. Most physicians and other health professionals provide some pain control in the normal course of their practice, and for the more complex instances of pain, they also call on additional help from a specific medical specialty devoted to pain, which is called pain medicine.

Pain management often uses a multidisciplinary approach for easing the suffering and improving the quality of life of anyone experiencing pain,  whether acute pain or chronic pain. Relief of pain in general (analgesia) is often an acute affair, whereas managing chronic pain requires additional dimensions. The typical pain management team includes medical practitioners, pharmacists, clinical psychologists, physiotherapists, occupational therapists, recreational therapists, physician assistants, nurses, and dentists. The team may also include other mental health specialists and massage therapists. Pain sometimes resolves quickly once the underlying trauma or pathology has healed, and is treated by one practitioner, with drugs such as pain relievers (analgesics) and occasionally also anxiolytics. Effective management of chronic (long-term) pain, however, frequently requires the coordinated efforts of the pain management team.  Effective pain management does not always mean total eradication of all pain. Rather, it often means achieving adequate quality of life in the presence of pain, through any combination of lessening the pain and/or better understanding it and being able to live happily despite it.

Medicine treats injuries and diseases to support and speed healing. It treats distressing symptoms such as pain to relieve suffering during treatment, healing, and dying. The task of medicine is to relieve suffering under three circumstances. The first is when a painful injury or pathology is resistant to treatment and persists. The second is when pain persists after the injury or pathology has healed. Finally, the third circumstance is when medical science cannot identify the cause of pain. Treatment approaches to chronic pain include pharmacological measures, such as analgesics (pain killer drugs), antidepressants, and anticonvulsants; interventional procedures, physical therapy, physical exercise, application of ice or heat; and psychological measures, such as biofeedback and cognitive behavioral therapy.

Defining pain

In the nursing profession, one common definition of pain is any problem that is "whatever the experiencing person says it is, existing whenever the experiencing person says it does".

Pain management includes patient and communication about the pain problem. To define the pain problem, a health care provider will likely ask questions such as:
 How intense is the pain?
 How does the pain feel?
 Where is the pain?
 What, if anything, makes the pain lessen?
 What, if anything, makes the pain increase?
 When did the pain start?
After asking such questions, the health care provider will have a description of the pain. Pain management will then be used to address that pain.

Adverse effects
There are many types of pain management. Each have their own benefits, drawbacks, and limits.

A common challenge in pain management is communication between the health care provider and the person experiencing pain. People experiencing pain may have difficulty recognizing or describing what they feel and how intense it is. Health care providers and patients may have difficulty communicating with each other about how pain responds to treatments. There is a risk in many types of pain management for the patient to take treatment that is less effective than needed or which causes other difficulties and side effects. Some treatments for pain can be harmful if overused. A goal of pain management for the patient and their health care provider is to identify the amount of treatment needed to address the pain without going beyond that limit.

Another problem with pain management is that pain is the body's natural way of communicating a problem. Pain is supposed to resolve as the body heals itself with time and pain management. Sometimes pain management covers a problem, and the patient might be less aware that they need treatment for a deeper problem.

Physical approach

Physical medicine and rehabilitation 
Physical medicine and rehabilitation uses a range of physical techniques such as heat and electrotherapy, as well as therapeutic exercises and behavioral therapy. These techniques are usually part of an interdisciplinary or multidisciplinary program that might also include pharmaceutical medicines. Spa therapy has showed positive effects in reducing pain among patients with chronic low back pain. However, there are limited studies looking at this approach. Studies have shown that kinesiotape could be used on individuals with chronic low back pain to reduce pain. The Center for Disease Control recommends that physical therapy and exercise can be prescribed as a positive alternative to opioids for decreasing one's pain in multiple injuries, illnesses, or diseases. This can include chronic low back pain, osteoarthritis of the hip and knee, or fibromyalgia. Exercise alone or with other rehabilitation disciplines (such as psychologically based approaches) can have a positive effect on reducing pain. In addition to improving pain, exercise also can improve one's well-being and general health.

Manipulative and mobilization therapy are safe interventions that likely reduce pain for patients with chronic low back pain. However, manipulation produces a larger effect than mobilization.

Specifically in chronic low back pain, education about the way the brain processes pain in conjunction with routine physiotherapy interventions may provide short term relief of disability and pain.

Exercise interventions 

Physical activity interventions, such as tai chi, yoga and Pilates, promote harmony of the mind and body through total body awareness. These practices incorporate breathing techniques, meditation and a wide variety of movements, while training the body to perform functionally by increasing strength, flexibility, and range of motion. Physical activity and exercise may improve chronic pain (pain lasting more than 12 weeks), and overall quality of life, while minimizing the need for pain medications. More specifically, walking has been effective in improving pain management in chronic low back pain.

TENS 
Transcutaneous electrical nerve stimulation (TENS) is a self-operated portable device intended to help regulate and control chronic pain via electrical impulses. Limited research has explored the effectiveness of TENS in relation to pain management of Multiple Sclerosis (MS). MS is a chronic autoimmune neurological disorder, which consists of the demyelination of the nerve axons and disruption of nerve conduction velocity and efficiency. In one study, electrodes were placed over the lumbar spine and participants received treatment twice a day and at any time when they experienced a painful episode. This study found that TENS would be beneficial to MS patients who reported localized or limited symptoms to one limb. The research is mixed with whether or not TENS helps manage pain in MS patients.

Transcutaneous electrical nerve stimulation has been found to be ineffective for lower back pain. However, it might help with diabetic neuropathy as well as other illnesses.

tDCS 
Transcranial direct current stimulation (tDCS) is a non-invasive technique of brain stimulation that can modulate activity in specific brain cortex regions, and it involves the application of low-intensity (up to 2 mA) constant direct current to the scalp through electrodes in order to modulate excitability of large cortical areas. tDCS may have a role in pain assessment by contributing to efforts in distinguishing between somatic and affective aspects of pain experience. Zaghi and colleagues (2011) found that the motor cortex, when stimulated with tDCS, increases the threshold for both the perception of non-painful and painful stimuli. Although there is a greater need for research examining the mechanism of electrical stimulation in relation to pain treatment, one theory suggests that the changes in thalamic activity may be due the influence of motor cortex stimulation on the decrease in pain sensations.

In relation to MS, a study found that after daily tDCS sessions resulted in an individual's subjective report of pain to decrease when compared to a sham condition. In addition, the study found a similar improvement at 1 to 3 days before and after each tDCS session.

Fibromyalgia is a disorder in which an individual experiences dysfunctional brain activity, musculoskeletal pain, fatigue, and tenderness in localized areas. Research examining tDCS for pain treatment in Fibromyalgia has found initial evidence for pain decreases. Specifically, the stimulation of the primary motor cortex resulted in significantly greater pain improvement in comparison to the control group (e.g., sham stimulation, stimulation of the DLPFC). However, this effect decreased after treatment ended, but remained significant for three weeks following the extinction of treatment.

Acupuncture 
Acupuncture involves the insertion and manipulation of needles into specific points on the body to relieve pain or for therapeutic purposes. An analysis of the 13 highest quality studies of pain treatment with acupuncture, published in January 2009 in the British Medical Journal, was unable to quantify the difference in the effect on pain of real, sham and no acupuncture. A systematic review in 2019 reported that acupuncture injection therapy was an effective treatment for patients with nonspecific chronic low back pain, and is widely used in Southeast Asian countries.

Light therapy 
Research has not found evidence that light therapy such as low level laser therapy is an  effective therapy for relieving low back pain.

Sound therapy 

Audioanalgesia and music therapy are both examples of using auditory stimuli to manage pain or other distress. They are generally viewed as (1) not sufficient when used alone, but also (2) helpful adjuncts to other forms of therapy.

Interventional procedures 

Interventional radiology procedures for pain control, typically used for chronic back pain, include epidural steroid injections, facet joint injections, neurolytic blocks, spinal cord stimulators and intrathecal drug delivery system implants.

Pulsed radiofrequency, neuromodulation, direct introduction of medication and nerve ablation may be used to target either the tissue structures and organ/systems responsible for persistent nociception or the nociceptors from the structures implicated as the source of chronic pain. Radiofrequency treatment has been seen to improve pain in patients for facet joint low back pain. However, continuous radiofrequency is more effective in managing pain than pulsed radiofrequency.

An intrathecal pump used to deliver very small quantities of medications directly to the spinal fluid. This is similar to epidural infusions used in labour and postoperatively.  The major differences are that it is much more common for the drug to be delivered into the spinal fluid (intrathecal) rather than epidurally, and the pump can be fully implanted under the skin. 

A spinal cord stimulator is an implantable medical device that creates electric impulses and applies them near the dorsal surface of the spinal cord provides a paresthesia ("tingling") sensation that alters the perception of pain by the patient.

Intra-articular ozone therapy 
Intra-articular ozone therapy has been seen to efficiently alleviate chronic pain in patients with knee osteoarthritis.

Psychological approach

Acceptance and commitment therapy 
Acceptance and Commitment Therapy (ACT) is a form of cognitive behavioral therapy that focuses on behavior change rather than symptom change, includes methods designed to alter the context around psychological experiences rather than to alter the makeup of the experiences, and emphasizes the use of experiential behavior change methods. The central process in ACT revolves around psychological flexibility, which in turn includes processes of acceptance, awareness, a present-oriented quality in interacting with experiences, an ability to persist or change behavior, and an ability to be guided by one's values. ACT has an increased evidence base for range of health and behavior problems, including chronic pain. ACT influences patients to adopt a tandem process to acceptance and change, which allows for a greater flexibility in the focus of treatment.

Recent research has applied ACT successfully to chronic pain in older adults due to in part of its direction from individual values and being highly customizable to any stage of life. In line with the therapeutic model of ACT, significant increases in process variables, pain acceptance, and mindfulness were also observed in a study applying ACT to chronic pain in older adults. In addition, these primary results suggested that an ACT based treatment may significantly improve levels of physical disability, psychosocial disability, and depression post-treatment and at a three-month follow-up for older adults with chronic pain.

Cognitive behavioral therapy
Cognitive behavioral therapy (CBT) helps patients with pain to understand the relationship between their pain, thoughts, emotions, and behaviors. A main goal in treatment is cognitive (thinking, reasoning or remembering) restructuring to encourage helpful thought patterns. This will target healthy activities such as regular exercise and pacing. Lifestyle changes are also trained to improve sleep patterns and to develop better coping skills for pain and other stressors using various techniques (e.g., relaxation, diaphragmatic breathing, and even biofeedback).

Studies have demonstrated the usefulness of cognitive behavioral therapy in the management of chronic low back pain, producing significant decreases in physical and psychosocial disability. CBT is significantly more effective than standard care in treatment of people with body-wide pain, like fibromyalgia. Evidence for the usefulness of CBT in the management of adult chronic pain is generally poorly understood, due partly to the proliferation of techniques of doubtful quality, and the poor quality of reporting in clinical trials. The crucial content of individual interventions has not been isolated and the important contextual elements, such as therapist training and development of treatment manuals, have not been determined. The widely varying nature of the resulting data makes useful systematic review and meta-analysis within the field very difficult.

In 2020, a systematic review of randomized controlled trials (RCTs) evaluated the clinical effectiveness of psychological therapies for the management of adult chronic pain (excluding headaches). There is no evidence that behaviour therapy (BT) is effective for reducing this type of pain, however BT may be useful for improving a persons mood immediately after treatment. This improvement appears to be small, and is short term in duration. CBT may have a small positive short-term effect on pain immediately following treatment. CBT may also have a small effect on reducing disability and potential catastrophizing that may be associated with adult chronic pain. These benefits do not appear to last very long following the therapy. CBT may contribute towards improving the mood of an adult who experiences chronic pain, which could possibility be maintained for longer periods of time.

For children and adolescents, a review of RCTs evaluating the effectiveness of psychological therapy for the management of chronic and recurrent pain found that psychological treatments are effective in reducing pain when people under 18 years old have headaches. This beneficial effect may be maintained for at least three months following the therapy. Psychological treatments may also improve pain control for children or adolescents who experience pain not related to headaches. It is not known if psychological therapy improves a child or adolescents mood and the potential for disability related to their chronic pain.

Hypnosis 
A 2007 review of 13 studies found evidence for the efficacy of hypnosis in the reduction of pain in some conditions. However the studies had some limitations like small study sizes, bringing up issues of power to detect group differences, and lacking credible controls for placebo or expectation. The authors concluded that "although the findings provide support for the general applicability of hypnosis in the treatment of chronic pain, considerably more research will be needed to fully determine the effects of hypnosis for different chronic-pain conditions."

Hypnosis has reduced the pain of some harmful medical procedures in children and adolescents. In clinical trials addressing other patient groups, it has significantly reduced pain compared to no treatment or some other non-hypnotic interventions. The effects of self hypnosis on chronic pain are roughly comparable to those of progressive muscle relaxation.

Hypnosis with analgesic (painkiller) has been seen to relieve chronic pain for most people and may be a safe and effective alternative to medications. However, high quality clinical data is needed to generalize to the whole chronic pain population.

Mindfulness meditation 
A 2013 meta-analysis of studies that used techniques centered around the concept of mindfulness, concluded, "that MBIs [mindfulness-based interventions] decrease the intensity of pain for chronic pain patients." A 2019 review of studies of brief mindfulness-based interventions (BMBI) concluded that BMBI are not recommended as a first-line treatment and could not confirm their efficacy in managing chronic or acute pain.

Mindfulness-based pain management 
Mindfulness-based pain management (MBPM) is a mindfulness-based intervention (MBI) providing specific applications for people living with chronic pain and illness. Adapting the core concepts and practices of mindfulness-based stress reduction (MBSR) and mindfulness-based cognitive therapy (MBCT), MBPM includes a distinctive emphasis on the practice of 'loving-kindness', and has been seen as sensitive to concerns about removing mindfulness teaching from its original ethical framework within Buddhism. It was developed by Vidyamala Burch and is delivered through the programs of Breathworks. It has been subject to a range of clinical studies demonstrating its effectiveness.

Medications 
The World Health Organization (WHO) recommends a pain ladder for managing pain relief with pharmaceutical medicine. It was first described for use in cancer pain. However it can be used by medical professionals as a general principle when managing any type of pain. In the treatment of chronic pain, the three-step WHO Analgesic Ladder provides guidelines for selecting the appropriate medicine. The exact medications recommended will vary by country and the individual treatment center, but the following gives an example of the WHO approach to treating chronic pain with medications. If, at any point, treatment fails to provide adequate pain relief, then the doctor and patient move onto the next step.

Mild pain 
Paracetamol (acetaminophen), or a nonsteroidal anti-inflammatory drug (NSAID) such as ibuprofen will relieve mild pain.

Mild to moderate pain 
Paracetamol, an NSAID or paracetamol in a combination product with a weak opioid such as tramadol, may provide greater relief than their separate use.  A combination of opioid with acetaminophen can be frequently used such as Percocet, Vicodin, or Norco.

Moderate to severe pain 
When treating moderate to severe pain, the type of the pain, acute or chronic, needs to be considered.  The type of pain can result in different medications being prescribed.  Certain medications may work better for acute pain, others for chronic pain, and some may work equally well on both.  Acute pain medication is for rapid onset of pain such as from an inflicted trauma or to treat post-operative pain.  Chronic pain medication is for alleviating long-lasting, ongoing pain.

Morphine is the gold standard to which all narcotics are compared. Semi-synthetic derivatives of morphine such as hydromorphone (Dilaudid), oxymorphone (Numorphan, Opana), nicomorphine (Vilan), hydromorphinol and others vary in such ways as duration of action, side effect profile and milligramme potency.  Fentanyl has the benefit of less histamine release and thus fewer side effects.  It can also be administered via transdermal patch which is convenient for chronic pain management. In addition to the intrathecal patch and injectable fentanyl formulations, the FDA (Food and Drug Administration) has approved various immediate release fentanyl products for breakthrough cancer pain (Actiq/OTFC/Fentora/Onsolis/Subsys/Lazanda/Abstral). Oxycodone is used across the Americas and Europe for relief of serious chronic pain. Its main slow-release formula is known as OxyContin. Short-acting tablets, capsules, syrups and ampules which contain OxyContin are available making it suitable for acute intractable pain or breakthrough pain. Diamorphine, and methadone are used less frequently. Clinical studies have shown that transdermal Buprenorphine is effective at reducing chronic pain. Pethidine, known in North America as meperidine, is not recommended  for pain management due to its low potency, short duration of action, and toxicity associated with repeated use.  Pentazocine, dextromoramide and dipipanone are also not recommended in new patients except for acute pain where other analgesics are not tolerated or are inappropriate, for pharmacological and misuse-related reasons.  In some countries potent synthetics such as piritramide and ketobemidone are used for severe pain. Tapentadol is a newer agent introduced in the last decade.

For moderate pain, tramadol, codeine, dihydrocodeine, and hydrocodone are used, with nicocodeine, ethylmorphine and propoxyphene or dextropropoxyphene (less commonly).

Drugs of other types can be used to help opioids combat certain types of pain. Amitriptyline is prescribed for chronic muscular pain in the arms, legs, neck and lower back with an opiate, or sometimes without it or with an NSAID.

While opiates are often used in the management of chronic pain, high doses are associated with an increased risk of opioid overdose.

Opioids 

In 2009, the Food and Drug Administration stated: "According to the National Institutes of Health, studies have shown that properly managed medical use of opioid analgesic compounds (taken exactly as prescribed) is safe, can manage pain effectively, and rarely causes addiction." In 2013, the FDA stated that "abuse and misuse of these products have created a serious and growing public health problem".

Opioid medications can provide short, intermediate or long acting analgesia depending upon the specific properties of the medication and whether it is formulated as an extended release drug. Opioid medications may be administered orally, by injection, via nasal mucosa or oral mucosa, rectally, transdermally, intravenously, epidurally and intrathecally. In chronic pain conditions that are opioid responsive, a combination of a long-acting (OxyContin, MS Contin, Opana ER, Exalgo and Methadone) or extended release medication is often prescribed along with a shorter-acting medication (oxycodone, morphine or hydromorphone) for breakthrough pain, or exacerbations.

Most opioid treatment used by patients outside of healthcare settings is oral (tablet, capsule or liquid), but suppositories and skin patches can be prescribed. An opioid injection is rarely needed for patients with chronic pain.

Although opioids are strong analgesics, they do not provide complete analgesia regardless of whether the pain is acute or chronic in origin. Opioids are effective analgesics in chronic malignant pain and modestly effective in nonmalignant pain management. However, there are associated adverse effects, especially during the commencement or change in dose. When opioids are used for prolonged periods drug tolerance, chemical dependency, diversion and addiction may occur.

Clinical guidelines for prescribing opioids for chronic pain have been issued by the American Pain Society and the American Academy of Pain Medicine. Included in these guidelines is the importance of assessing the patient for the risk of substance abuse, misuse, or addiction. Factors correlated with an elevated risk of opioid misuse include a history of substance use disorder, younger age, major depression, and the use of psychotropic medications. Physicians who prescribe opioids should integrate this treatment with any psychotherapeutic intervention the patient may be receiving. The guidelines also recommend monitoring not only the pain but also the level of functioning and the achievement of therapeutic goals. The prescribing physician should be suspicious of abuse when a patient reports a reduction in pain but has no accompanying improvement in function or progress in achieving identified goals.

The list below consists of commonly used opioid analgesics which have long-acting formulations. Common brand names for the extended release formulation are in parentheses.
 Oxycodone (OxyContin)
 Hydromorphone (Exalgo, Hydromorph Contin)
 Morphine (M-Eslon, MS Contin)
 Oxymorphone (Opana ER)
 Fentanyl, transdermal (Duragesic)
 Buprenorphine*, transdermal (Butrans)
 Tramadol (Ultram ER)
 Tapentadol (Nucynta ER)
 Methadone* (Metadol, Methadose)
 Hydrocodone bitartrate (Hysingla ER) and bicarbonate (Zohydro ER)
*Methadone and buprenorphine are each used both for the treatment of opioid addiction and as analgesics

Nonsteroidal anti-inflammatory drugs 
The other major group of analgesics are nonsteroidal anti-inflammatory drugs (NSAID). They work by inhibiting the release of prostaglandins, which cause inflammatory pain. Acetaminophen/paracetamol is not always included in this class of medications. However, acetaminophen may be administered as a single medication or in combination with other analgesics (both NSAIDs and opioids). The alternatively prescribed NSAIDs such as ketoprofen and piroxicam have limited benefit in chronic pain disorders and with long-term use are associated with significant adverse effects. The use of selective NSAIDs designated as selective COX-2 inhibitors have significant cardiovascular and cerebrovascular risks which have limited their utilization. Common NSAIDs include aspirin, ibuprofen, and naproxen. There are many NSAIDs such as parecoxib (selective COX-2 inhibitor) with proven effectiveness after different surgical procedures. Wide use of non-opioid analgesics can reduce opioid-induced side-effects.

Antidepressants and antiepileptic drugs 
Some antidepressant and antiepileptic drugs are used in chronic pain management and act primarily within the pain pathways of the central nervous system, though peripheral mechanisms have been attributed as well. They are generally used to treat nerve brain that results from injury to the nervous system. Neuropathy can be due to chronic high blood sugar levels (diabetic neuropathy). These drugs also reduce pain from viruses such as shingles, phantom limb pain and post-stroke pain. These mechanisms vary and in general are more effective in neuropathic pain disorders as well as complex regional pain syndrome. A common anti-epileptic drug is gabapentin, and an example of an antidepressant would be amitriptyline.

Cannabinoids 

Evidence of medical marijuana's effect on reducing pain is generally conclusive. Detailed in a 1999 report by the Institute of Medicine, "the available evidence from animal and human studies indicates that cannabinoids can have a substantial analgesic effect". In a 2013 review study published in Fundamental & Clinical Pharmacology, various studies were cited in demonstrating that cannabinoids exhibit comparable effectiveness to opioids in models of acute pain and even greater effectiveness in models of chronic pain. It is mainly the THC strain of medical marijuana that provide analgesic benefits, as opposed to the CBD strain.

Ketamine 

Ketamine is a safe, effective alternative to opioids in the treatment of acute pain in the ED. What's the ED?  Ketamine probably?  reduces pain more than opioids and with less nausea and vomiting.

Other analgesics 
Other drugs which can potentiate conventional analgesics or have analgesic properties in certain circumstances are called analgesic adjuvant medications. Gabapentin, an anticonvulsant, can reduce neuropathic pain itself and can also potentiate opiates.   Drugs with anticholinergic activity, such as orphenadrine and cyclobenzaprine, are given in conjunction with opioids for neuropathic pain. Orphenadrine and cyclobenzaprine are also muscle relaxants, and are useful in painful musculoskeletal conditions.  Clonidine, an alpha-2 receptor agonist, is another drug that has found use as an analgesic adjuvant. In 2021, researchers described a novel type of pain therapy – a CRISPR-dCas9 epigenome editing method for repressing Nav1.7 gene expression which showed therapeutic potential in three mouse models of chronic pain.

Self-management 
Self-management of chronic pain has been described as the individual's ability to manage various aspects of their chronic pain. Self-management can include building self-efficacy, monitoring one's own symptoms, goal setting and action planning. It also includes patient-physician shared decision-making, among others. The benefits of self-management vary depending on self-management techniques used. They only have  marginal benefits in management of chronic musculoskeletal pain. Some research has shown that self-management of pain can use different approaches. Those approaches can range from different therapies such as yoga, acupuncture,exercise and other relaxation techniques. Patients could also take a more natural approach by taking different minerals, vitamins or herbs. However, research has shown there is a difference between rural patients and non-rural patients having more access to different self-management approaches. Physicians in these areas may be readily prescribing more pain medication in these rural cities due to being less experienced with pain management. Simply put, it is sometimes easier for rural patients to get a prescription that insurance pays for instead of natural approaches that cost more money than they can afford to spend on their pain management. Self-management may be a more expensive alternative.

Society and culture
The medical treatment of pain as practiced in Greece and Turkey is called algology (from the Greek άλγος, algos, "pain"). The Hellenic Society of Algology and the Turkish Algology-Pain Society are the relevant local bodies affiliated to the International Association for the Study of Pain (IASP).

Undertreatment 

Undertreatment of pain is the absence of pain management therapy for a person in pain when treatment is indicated.

Consensus in evidence-based medicine and the recommendations of medical specialty organizations establish guidelines to determine the treatment for pain which health care providers ought to offer. For various social reasons, persons in pain may not seek or may not be able to access treatment for their pain. Health care providers may not provide the treatment which authorities recommend. Some studies  about gender biases have concluded that female pain recipients are often over looked when it comes to the perception of their pain. Whether they appeared to be in high levels of pain didn't make a difference for their observers. The women participants in the studies were still perceived to be in less pain than they actually were. Men participants on the other hand were offered pain relief while their self reporting indicated that  their pain levels didn't necessarily warrant treatment. Biases exist when it comes to gender. Prescribers  have been seen over and under prescribing treatment to individuals based on them being male or female .There are other prevalent reasons that undertreatment of pain occurs. Gender is a factor as well as race. When it comes to prescribers treating patients racial disparities has become a real factor. Research has shown that non-white individuals pain perception has affected their pain treatment. The African-American community has been shown to suffer significantly when it comes to trusting the medical community to treat them. Oftentimes medication although available to be prescribed is dispensed in less quantities due to their pain being perceived on a smaller scale. The black community could be undermined by physicians thinking they are not in as much pain as they are reporting. Another occurrence may be physicians simply making the choice not to treat the patient accordingly in spite of the self-reported pain level. Racial disparity is definitely a real issue in the world of pain management.

In children

Acute pain is common in children and adolescents as a result of injury, illness, or necessary medical procedures. Chronic pain is present in approximately 15–25% of children and adolescents. It may be caused by an underlying disease, such as sickle cell anemia, cystic fibrosis, rheumatoid arthritis. Cancer or functional disorders such as migraines, fibromyalgia, and complex regional pain could also cause chronic pain in children.

Pain assessment in children is often challenging due to limitations in developmental level, cognitive ability, or their previous pain experiences. Clinicians must observe physiological and behavioral cues exhibited by the child to make an assessment. Self-report, if possible, is the most accurate measure of pain. Self-report pain scales involve younger kids matching their pain intensity to photographs of other children's faces, such as the Oucher Scale, pointing to schematics of faces showing different pain levels, or pointing out the location of pain on a body outline. Questionnaires for older children and adolescents include the Varni-Thompson Pediatric Pain Questionnaire (PPQ) and the Children's Comprehensive Pain Questionnaire. They are often utilized for individuals with chronic or persistent pain.

Acetaminophen, nonsteroidal anti-inflammatory agents, and opioid analgesics are commonly used to treat acute or chronic pain symptoms in children and adolescents. However a pediatrician should be consulted before administering any medication.

Caregivers may provide nonpharmacological treatment for children and adolescents because it carries minimal risk and is cost effective compared to pharmacological treatment. Nonpharmacologic interventions vary by age and developmental factors. Physical interventions to ease pain in infants include swaddling, rocking, or sucrose via a pacifier. For children and adolescents physical interventions include hot or cold application, massage, or acupuncture. Cognitive behavioral therapy (CBT) aims to reduce the emotional distress and improve the daily functioning of school-aged children and adolescents with pain by changing the relationship between their thoughts and emotions. In addition this therapy teaches them adaptive coping strategies. Integrated interventions in CBT include relaxation technique, mindfulness, biofeedback, and acceptance (in the case of chronic pain). Many therapists will hold sessions for caregivers to provide them with effective management strategies.

Professional certification
Pain management practitioners come from all fields of medicine.  In addition to medical practitioners, a pain management team may often benefit from the input of pharmacists, physiotherapists, clinical psychologists and occupational therapists, among others.  Together the multidisciplinary team can help create a package of care suitable to the patient.

Pain medicine in the United States 
Pain physicians are often fellowship-trained board-certified anesthesiologists, neurologists, physiatrists, emergency physicians, or psychiatrists. Palliative care doctors are also specialists in pain management. The American Society of Interventional Pain Physicians, the American Board of Anesthesiology, the American Osteopathic Board of Anesthesiology (recognized by the AOABOS), the American Board of Physical Medicine and Rehabilitation, the American Board of Emergency Medicine and the American Board of Psychiatry and Neurology each provide certification for a subspecialty in pain management following fellowship training. The fellowship training is recognized by the American Board of Medical Specialties (ABMS) or the American Osteopathic Association Bureau of Osteopathic Specialists (AOABOS). As the field of pain medicine has grown rapidly, many practitioners have entered the field, some non-ACGME board-certified.

See also 

 Equianalgesic
 Opioid comparison, an example of an equianalgesic chart
 Pain Catastrophizing Scale
 Pain ladder
 Pain management during childbirth
 Pain psychology

References

Further reading

External links

World Health Organization (WHO) Treatment Guidelines on Pain

 
Palliative care
Acute pain